Spiczyn  is a village in Łęczna County, Lublin Voivodeship, in eastern Poland and is the seat of the gmina (administrative district) called Gmina Spiczyn.

References

Spiczyn
Lublin Governorate